Hotelboy Ed Martin is an East German film. It was released in 1955.

See also
 Afraid to Talk (1932)

External links
 

1955 films
1955 drama films
German drama films
East German films
1950s German-language films
German films based on plays
Films set in the United States
Remakes of American films
1950s German films